The African Journal of Food, Agriculture, Nutrition and Development is a peer-reviewed academic journal covering food and nutrition issues in Africa.

External links 

African Journal of Food, Agriculture, Nutrition and Development at Bioline International

References 

Open access journals
Food science journals
Publications established in 2001